Elin Rosseland (born 5 April 1959 in Norway) is a singer, bandleader, and composer who studied at the Norwegian Academy of Music and is known from collaborations with Vigleik Storaas, Johannes Eick, Sidsel Endresen, Eldbjørg Raknes, Christian Wallumrød, and Johannes Eick.

Career
Rosseland has played with "Stein Eide Band", the Norwegian band "Kix" and the octet "Winds Hot & Cool" (with album in 1984). She early developed her own quintet "Fair Play" based in Trondheim, with the musicians Tor Yttredal, Vigleik Storaas, Johannes Eick and Trond Kopperud. They released the album Fair Play (1989).
She joined the band "Søyr" (1986–94), the trio "ESE" with Sidsel Endresen and Eldbjørg Raknes (Gack, Jazzland 1998).
  
The work Fra himmelen gave her the NOPA Award for the work of the year, for both music and lyrics, in 1996 (released on NorCD 1997, with Christian Wallumrød and Johannes Eick).  She also released Moment (2004) in trio with Johannes Eick and Rob Waring, and performed with Knut Riisnæs at Oslo Jazz Festival in a piece where "Oslo Storband" performed the Peer Gynt Suite by Helge Hurum.

Rosseland associated with jazz vocal training at Norges Musikkhøgskole.

Honors
1996: NOPA's Award for the work of the year, for both music and lyrics
2009: Radka Toneff Memorial Award

Discography

Solo projects
1989: Fair Play (Odin)
1993: Fair Play (2) (Grappa), featuring Norma Winstone (vocals)
1997: Fra himmelen, within "The trio" including Christian Wallumrød and Johannes Eick
2004: Moment (NorCD), in trio including with Johannes Eick and Rob Waring
2007: Elin Rosseland Trio (NorCD), including with Mats Eilertsen and Rob Waring
2009: Jazz Mass (Inner Ear), with Tore Johansen, "Bodø Domkor" and "Bodø Sinfonietta»
2009: Standards and Vanguards (Grappa), with Helge Iberg
2014: Ekko (MNJ Records), as featured artist with Trondheim Jazz Orchestra
2014: Vokal (NorCD)

With Espen Rud
1984: Hotelsuite

With Lars Martin Myhre
1985: Bak speilet

With "Søyr»
1987: Vectors
1994: Bussene lengter hjem

With Helge Hurum
1987: Fata morgana

With the trio "ESE" (Eldbjørg Raknes & Sidsel Endresen)
1998: Gack! (Gack, Jazzland)

With Lars Saabye Christensen
1999: Skrapjern Og Silke (Grappa)

With Nils Petter Molvær
2005: Er (Sula)

References

External links 
 Rosseland, Elin Biography – Norsk Musikkinformasjon MIC.no
 Elin Rosseland Biography – SNL.no Store Norske Leksikon (in Norwegian)

Norwegian women jazz singers
Norwegian jazz composers
Academic staff of the Norwegian Academy of Music
Jazzland Recordings (1997) artists
1959 births
Living people
20th-century Norwegian women singers
20th-century Norwegian singers
21st-century Norwegian women singers
21st-century Norwegian singers
Søyr members
NorCD artists
Odin Records artists
Inner Ear artists
Grappa Music artists